Sunico Productions is a company founded by Denmark-based Indian businessman Mangharam Harwani to preserve Sindhi culture, language, and traditions through film.  Sunico produces Sindhi language films, and was the first production house to launch a Sindhi film after a gap of 5 years. Sunico also sells online CDs and DVDs of its films and provides streaming facilities for viewing their movies online, and is considered "one of the leading suppliers in Denmark".

Films
 Pyar Ka Tarana (1993) (written and directed by Dev Anand)
 Pyar Kare Dis : Feel The Power of Love (2007)

Directors
The following directors have worked under the Sunico banner:

 Kamal Nathani – Pyar Kare Dis : Feel The Power of Love (2007)
 Dev Anand – Pyar Ka Tarana (1993)

References

External links
 Official Site
 
 Sunico Productions at the Internet Movie Database

Film production companies of Denmark